Twilight: 2000 is a role-playing video game released in 1991 for MS-DOS. It is based on the tabletop role-playing game of the same name.

Gameplay
The video game depicts a squad of 20 soldiers stranded behind enemy lines in Poland, struggling against the despot Baron Czarny.

Development
In 1991, Game Designers' Workshop licensees Paragon developed a computer game adaptation (complete with expansion, "the Colonel") of Twilight: 2000.

Reception
J. D. Lambright reviewed the game for Computer Gaming World, and stated that "RPGers who like plenty of combat should find Twilight 2000 an excellent choice."

Reviews
ASM (Aktueller Software Markt) - Aug, 1993
PC Games (Germany) - Oct, 1993
Computer Gaming World - Jun, 1991

References

External links 
 

1991 video games
DOS games
DOS-only games
Role-playing video games
Strategy video games
Twilight: 2000
Video games based on tabletop role-playing games
Video games developed in the United States
Video games set in Poland